Alias French Gertie is an American pre-Code crime film directed by George Archainbaud from a screenplay by Wallace Smith, based upon the unproduced play The Chatterbox by Bayard Veiller. The film stars Bebe Daniels and Ben Lyon, who were making their first on-screen appearance together. A copy of this film survives in the Library of Congress.

Plot
"French Gertie" is a jewel thief; posing as French maid named Marie. She has cased out the safe of her employer and intends to steal its contents. However, the night she chooses for the robbery, there is another thief who also shows up to empty the safe, Jimmy. Jimmy opens the safe, and the two agree to split the contents fifty-fifty. They are interrupted by the arrival of the police. Jimmy gallantly secretes Marie away, and takes the rap himself, impressing her.

After serving his year's sentence, Jimmy is reunited with Gertie, and the two form a partnership in crime. After several bank robberies, Marie and Jimmy agree that after one last haul, they will go straight. Marie, who has become friends with the next-door neighbors in her apartment building, Mr. and Mrs. Matson, who entice Jimmy to invest his $30,000 savings in Matson's business. Unfortunately, the Matsons turn out to be crooks themselves, and have swindled Jimmy out of his life's savings.

When Jimmy determines to go back to safecracking, beginning with Marie's former employers, Marie hatches a plot to encourage him to go straight. When a good-hearted detective, Kelcey, lets them off the hook with the promise that they will go straight, they agree.

Cast

Reception
The New York Times critic, Mordaunt Hall, gave the film a lukewarm review, praising the acting of Bebe Daniels, while not being as kind to Ben Lyon. Overall, he said the film, "... has not been handled with the subtlety and smoothness it deserves. Nevertheless, up to a certain point, it is a production that holds the interest, but what should have been the main idea is sacrificed for a more obvious turn of events."

Notes
This is the first film in which Bebe Daniels and Ben Lyon co-starred. They were married a short time afterwards, in June 1930, and the two remained married until her death in 1971. The play from which this screenplay was adapted, The Chatterbox, does not appear to have ever been produced.

The film was a remake of the 1925 FBO silent film, Smooth as Satin, starring Evelyn Brent and Bruce Gordon, and directed by Ralph Ince.

References

External links
 Alias French Gertie at, imdb.com
 

RKO Pictures films
American black-and-white films
Melodrama films
1930 crime drama films
1930 films
American films based on plays
Films directed by George Archainbaud
American crime drama films
1930s English-language films
1930s American films